Július Tomin (April 12, 1915 – April 7, 2003) was a high school teacher and well-known author from Czechoslovakia. He was persecuted during the Soviet occupation for promoting Interlingua as a second language.

Life
He was born during the first World War in the village of Nová Baňa, founded by German colonists. His high school studies concluded in Slovakia, and he continued at the University of Prague at the age of 18.
One of Tomin's four sons, also named Július, participated in the struggle against Communism as part of the renowned opposition group Charter 77. Tomin died on April 7, 2003, after a period of declining health. He was 87.

Interlingua
He became interested in Interlingua soon after the Soviet invasion of Czechoslovakia in August 1968, when Bent Andersen, then administrator of the Union Mundial pro Interlingua, sent him a letter about the language. In Krupina, Tomin taught Interlingua for many years to help his students understand the international words in their own language.

His first article on Interlingua was published in the Slovak magazine Príroda a spoločnosť (Nature and Society) in 1971. Soon after its publication, he began to receive anonymous letters. One read,  "What – who do you serve?! Imperialism, the American millionaires; you are a slave paid by our enemies, by warmongers. Our language Esperanto is the language of peace, of friendship, language of Lenin, of humanism. – If you don't stop spreading Interlingua, you will see!"

He continued his work, writing articles for publication and securing a presentation on Bratislavan radio. One long article, "The language for science and technology," was translated into Croatian and Hungarian. His Interlingua-Slovak dictionary was published in 1979, and his 10-lesson course in 1985. This was later translated into Polish.

At a conference in Prague, Tomin described further persecution in the Soviet-occupied country:
"The Esperantists – one of them made me aware [of this] – were spying, to see if I was selling publications to accuse me to our political organs. Thank God, my hands were clean."

He initiated correspondence between his Interlingua class and that of Ingvar Stenström in Varberg, Sweden. In 1987, the House of Pedagogy published his manual on internationalisms in the Slovak, essentially an introduction to Interlingua. He later explained,
"...I inform the reader about Interlingua without mentioning or criticizing Esperanto. But one of the reviewers, a fanatical Esperantist, wrote in the review, "The chapter about Interlingua must be unconditionally abolished!"
He added, "After a grave struggle, I won out."

He became the Czech Interlingua representative in 1988. After the dissolution of Czechoslovakia in 1993, he reassumed this charge as the Slovak representative, a position he would hold until 2000. In 1994, after the fall of the Iron Curtain, Tomin published a book about Interlingua. It received enthusiastic reviews from the Czech press. He followed this work with a large Slovak-Interlingua dictionary in 1996. He came to advocate Interlingua as a "neutral language" and as a "just, fair solution" to linguistic problems in Europe.

Tomin wrote numerous articles explaining the linguistic foundation and educational purposes of Interlingua, but his articles on the struggle against smoking have brought him more media attention.

See also
History of Interlingua

Notes

References
Breinstrup, Thomas, "Persecutate pro parlar interlingua", Panorama in Interlingua, 1995, Issue 5.
 Biographia: Július Tomin, Historia de Interlingua, 2001, Revised 2006.
 Tomin, Július, Information con obstaculos in Tchecoslovachia, Historia de Interlingua: Communication Sin Frontieras, 2001, Revised 2006.

External links
 Union Mundial pro Interlingua

Interlingua speakers
Slovak educators
1915 births
2003 deaths
Czechoslovak writers